Botanical gardens in Sweden have collections consisting entirely of Sweden native and endemic species; most have a collection that include plants from around the world. There are botanical gardens and arboreta in all states and territories of Sweden, most are administered by local governments, some are privately owned.
 Bergianska trädgården, University of Stockholm, Stockholm. 9000 species.
 Göteborg Botanical Garden, Gothenburg. 16000 species outdoors, 4000 species indoors.
 Linnaean Garden, Uppsala.
 Lund Botanical Garden, Lund University, Lund. 7000 species outdoors, 2000 species indoors.
 Uppsala Botanical Garden, Uppsala University, Uppsala. 13000 species.
 The Knowledge Garden at the Swedish University of Agricultural Sciences,  Uppsala. 1500 species.
 DBW Botanical Garden, Visby, Gotland.

References 

Sweden
Botanical gardens